Caroline Grimm is a French screenwriter, actress, producer and director. She published her first book, Moi, Olympe de Gouges, a biography, in 2009. Adapted to the theater, her work proved to be a big hit. Her second book, Churchill m’a menti (Flammarion, 2014), was widely acclaimed by critics.

References

French writers
Year of birth missing (living people)
Living people
Place of birth missing (living people)